The 1967 Campeonato Brasileiro Série A (officially the 1967 Torneio Roberto Gomes Pedrosa) was the 9th edition of the Campeonato Brasileiro Série A. It began on March 5 and ended on June 8. Palmeiras won the championship, the 2nd national title of the club in 8 years of tournament contention. This 1st edition of the tournament was organized by Federação de Futebol do Estado do Rio de Janeiro and Federação Paulista de Futebol.

Championship format

First-phase: the 15 participants play all against all twice, but divided into two groups (one 7 and one 8) for classification, in the Group B, each team plays two more matches against any other. The first 2 of each group are classified for the finals.
Final-phase: the four clubs classified play all against all twice. The club with most points at this stage is the champion.
Tie-breaking criteria:
1 - Goal difference2 - Raffle

With one victory, a team still gained 2 points, instead of 3.

First phase

Group A

Group B

Final phase

Matches:

References

Sources
 1967 Torneio Roberto Gomes Pedrosa at RSSSF
Torneio Roberto Gomes Pedrosa at Futebol Nacional.com.br
1967 Torneio Roberto Gomes Pedrosa at RSSSF

Torneio Roberto Gomes Pedrosa
Roberto
Bra
B